John Bell (12 May 176315 April 1820) was a Scottish anatomist and surgeon.

Life
Bell was born in Edinburgh, Scotland; an elder brother of Sir Charles Bell. After completing his professional education at Edinburgh, he carried on from 1790 in Surgeons' Square an anatomical lecture-theatre, where, in spite of much opposition, due partly to the unconservative character of his teaching, he attracted large audiences by his lectures, in which he was for a time assisted by his younger brother Charles. From 1793 to 1795, he published Discourses on the Nature and Cure of Wounds. He is considered, along with Pierre-Joseph Desault and John Hunter, to be a founder of the modern surgery of the vascular system.

A man of compassion, Bell made many enemies because he was outspoken about the unnecessary pain and suffering inflicted by incompetent surgeons practicing in Scotland. In 1800 he became involved in an unfortunate controversy with James Gregory (1753–1821), the professor of medicine at Edinburgh. Gregory in 1800 attacked the system whereby the fellows of the Royal College of Surgeons of Edinburgh acted in rotation as surgeons at the Royal Infirmary, with the result that the younger fellows were excluded. Bell, who was among the number, composed an Answer for the Junior Members (1800), and ten years later published a collection of Letters on Professional Character and Manners, which he had addressed to Gregory. After his exclusion from the infirmary he ceased to lecture and devoted himself to study and practice.

Bell was also a talented artist, and was one of the few medical men to illustrate his own work. In 1816 he was injured by a fall from his horse and in the following year went to Italy for the benefit of his health. He died at Rome on 15 April 1820 and he is buried in the Protestant Cemetery, Rome, just behind the tomb of poet John Keats.

His works also included Principles of Surgery (1801), Anatomy of the Human Body, which went through several editions and was translated into German, and Observations on Italy, published by his widow in 1825.

References

Sources

Further reading

External links 
 John Bell engravings - Anatomia 1522-1867 digital collection, Thomas Fisher Rare Book Library, University of Toronto

1763 births
1820 deaths
18th-century Scottish medical doctors
19th-century Scottish people
Medical doctors from Edinburgh
Alumni of the University of Edinburgh
Scottish surgeons
Scottish anatomists
Scottish medical writers
Scottish illustrators
Scottish travel writers
Burials in the Protestant Cemetery, Rome